Proper Records is an English record label founded by Proper Music Group Chairman - Malcolm Mills and Paul Riley. Commencing with a handful of releases, including the Balham Alligators and Chilli Willi and the Red Hot Peppers, the label grew in stature and renown through its reissue marque, 'Proper Box'. Featuring jazz, country, and rock and roll artists, these releases now total over 200.

The label has become better known for releasing new albums by contemporary artists such as Bonnie Raitt, Joan Baez, Richard Thompson, Nick Lowe, Dr. John, Los Lobos, Willie Nelson & Asleep At The Wheel, The Blind Boys Of Alabama, Loudon Wainwright III and many more.

Subsidiary labels include Specific Jazz and Navigator Records.

The company was based on an industrial estate in south London but relocated to Surrey Quays in 2017. Sister company Proper Music Distribution has won the Music Week Distributor of the Year Award three times.

Roster
 
 Aimee Mann
 Alison Moorer
 Andy Fairweather Low
 Andy McKee
 Angélique Kidjo
 Art Garfunkel
 Asleep at the Wheel
 Baddies
 Bap Kennedy
 Ben Glover
 Bill Kirchen
 Blancmange
 Blind Boys of Alabama
 Bonnie Raitt
 Chilli Willi and the Red Hot Peppers
 Cowboy Junkies
 Dan Penn
 Dave Rotheray
 Dave Stewart
 Dennis Locorriere
 Diana Jones
 Don McLean
 Dr. John
 Elizabeth Cook
 Gretchen Peters
 Hacienda Brothers
 Huey Lewis & The News
 The Hot Club of Cowtown
 Ian McLagan
 Jimmie Vaughan
 Jimmy Webb
 Joan Baez
 Drumbo
 Krissy Matthews
 Laurence Jones
 Little Feat
 Los Lobos
 Loudon Wainwright III
 Malcolm Holcombe
 Mary Gauthier
 Matraca Berg
 Neilson Hubbard
 Nick Lowe
 Nicole Atkins
 Paul Brady
 Paul Heaton
 Pete Brown
 Red Sky July
 Richard Thompson
 Robyn Hitchcock
 Ruthie Foster
 Sonny Landreth
 Spooner Oldham
 Steve Cradock
 Suzy Bogguss
 Texas Tornados
 The Balham Alligators
 The Features
 The Waterboys
 The Webb Sisters
 Tim O'Brien
 Tom Russell
 Willie Nelson

References

External links
 Official website

Record labels based in London
Record labels established in 1988
Jazz record labels